Jericho Creek is a tributary of North Fork John Day River in Umatilla County, Oregon, in the United States.

References

Rivers of Oregon
Rivers of Umatilla County, Oregon